Rory Gallagher was an Irish guitarist, singer, songwriter, and producer.

The name may also refer to:
 Rory Gallagher (album), the debut solo album by Irish blues rock musician Rory Gallagher
 Rory Gallagher (Gaelic footballer), a Gaelic football manager and former player